Juber is a surname. Notable people with the name include:

 Ilsey Juber (born 1986), American singer and songwriter
 Laurence Juber (born 1952), English musician